Heterorachis is a genus of moths in the family Geometridae described by Warren in 1898.

Species
Heterorachis abdita Herbulot, 1955
Heterorachis acuta Herbulot, 1955
Heterorachis amplior Herbulot, 1955
Heterorachis asyllaria (Swinhoe, 1904)
Heterorachis carpenteri (Prout, 1915)
Heterorachis conradti Prout, 1938
Heterorachis defossa Herbulot, 1955
Heterorachis despoliata Prout, 1916
Heterorachis devocata (Walker, 1861)
Heterorachis diaphana (Warren, 1899)
Heterorachis dichorda Prout, 1915
Heterorachis diphrontis Prout, 1922
Heterorachis disconotata Prout, 1916
Heterorachis extrema Herbulot, 1996
Heterorachis fulcrata Herbulot, 1996
Heterorachis furcata Herbulot, 1965
Heterorachis fuscoterminata Prout, 1915
Heterorachis gloriola Thierry-Mieg, 1915
Heterorachis haploa (Prout, 1912)
Heterorachis harpifera Herbulot, 1955
Heterorachis idmon Fawcett, 1916
Heterorachis insolens (Prout, 1917)
Heterorachis insueta Prout, 1922
Heterorachis lunatimargo (Prout, 1911)
Heterorachis malachitica (Saalmüller, 1880)
Heterorachis melanophragma Prout, 1918
Heterorachis perviridis (Prout, 1912)
Heterorachis platti Janse, 1935
Heterorachis prouti (Bethune-Baker, 1913)
Heterorachis reducta Herbulot, 1955
Heterorachis simplicissima (Prout, 1912)
Heterorachis soaindrana Herbulot, 1972
Heterorachis suarezi Herbulot, 1965
Heterorachis tanala Herbulot, 1965
Heterorachis tornata Prout, 1922
Heterorachis trita Prout, 1922
Heterorachis tsara Viette, 1971
Heterorachis turlini Herbulot, 1977
Heterorachis ultramarina Herbulot, 1968
Heterorachis viettei Herbulot, 1955

References

Warren, W. (1898). "New species and genera of the families Drepanulidae, Thyrididae, Uraniidae, Epiplemidae, and Geometridae from the Old-World regions". Novitates Zoologicae. 5: 221–258 (on pages 234/5).

Geometridae